Cameron Myers (born June 9, 2006) is an Australian track and field athlete. In 2023 he broke the world record for the fastest time to run a mile by a sixteen year-old. He became the second youngest person in the world to ever have run a sub-four minute mile, and aged sixteen took the Australian national under-20 record for a mile.

Early life
From Canberra, Myers attends Lake Ginnindera College.

From aged 10 he trained with [Lee Bobbin]. At age 14 Bobbin started training Myers with Dick Telford and his elite group including Olympic 1500-metre runner Jye Edwards. He also runs for Bankstown Athletics Club in Sydney.

Career

2022:Aussie 1 mile champ
Myers won the Albie Thomas 1 Mile Australian Championship on December 5 2022, at The Crest in Sydney.

2023:16yo world-record holder 
Myers broke Ryan Gregson’s Australian under-18 record for the 1500 metres by more than three seconds when he ran 4:07.04 on January 24, 2023.

In February 2023, Myers became the second youngest person in history to break the four-minute mile. Myers ran  3:55.44 seconds at Albert Park in Melbourne at the Maurie Plant Meet aged 16 years and 259 days. Myers was nine days older than Jakob Ingebrigtsen when he ran 3:58.07 in May 2017, but was more than two seconds faster. Speaking about breaking the world record for a 16-year-old Myers said “I don’t think it changes much for me. It is about how you progress to the open ranks. It’s only an age world record. It’s cool to have, but it’s not the be-all and end-all.” The time also broke the Australian u-20 record.

References

External links

2006 births
Living people
Australian male middle-distance runners
Sportspeople from Canberra
21st-century Australian people